Ethan Mbappé Lottin (born 29 December 2006) is a French footballer who plays as a midfielder for Paris Saint-Germain.

Early life
Born in Montreuil, Seine-Saint-Denis, Mbappé was raised in a footballing family, with brother Kylian and adopted brother Jirès Kembo Ekoko both having professional footballing careers. Their father is Cameroonian and their mother is Algerian.

Club career
Ethan followed in both of his older brothers' footsteps by joining local side AS Bondy in 2015. After two years with AS Bondy, Mbappé joined French giants Paris Saint-Germain (PSG) in 2017, in the same transfer window that saw the club bring in his brother Kylian on loan. He scored on his debut for the under-12 team.

Mbappé signed a new three-year contract with PSG in June 2021. On 16 December 2022, at the age of 15, he made his debut with the club's senior team in a 2–1 friendly win over Paris FC.

International career
Mbappé was called up to the France under-16 team in November 2021.

Style of play
Unlike his brother Kylian, a forward known for his lightning-quick pace, Ethan is a technical, left-footed midfielder.

Personal life
In January 2022, Mbappé was involved in a minor traffic accident, after the car he was in was struck by a drunk driver. He did not suffer any major injuries.

References

External links
  

2006 births
Living people
French footballers
Sportspeople from Montreuil, Seine-Saint-Denis
Footballers from Seine-Saint-Denis
French sportspeople of Cameroonian descent
French sportspeople of Algerian descent
French people of Kabyle descent
Association football midfielders
Paris Saint-Germain F.C. players
Black French sportspeople